This is a list of Brazilian federative units by homicide rate, according to data from the Atlas da Violência (years 1996 to 2021, prepared by the Instituto de Pesquisa Econômica Aplicada (Ipea) and the Fórum Brasileiro de Segurança Pública (FBSP) and the Mapa da Violência from 1998 (1980s to 1988 ) and 2000 (years 1989 to 1995, prepared by United Nations Educational Organization, Science and Culture (UNESCO).

The 2000s and 2020s 
The list of decades, by default, is ordered by homicide rate in a decreasing manner according to 2021. That is, the federative units with the highest rates this year are closer to the top of the list.

States

The 2000s and 2020s 
The list of decades, by default, is ordered by homicide rate in a decreasing manner according to 2021. That is, the federative units with the highest rates this year are closer to the top of the list.

See also
List of Brazilian federative units by homicide rate
 Crime in Brazil
 List of cities by murder rate
 Homicide in world cities
 List of countries by firearm-related death rate
 List of countries by intentional homicide rate

References

Murder in Brazil
Brazil
Murder rate
Brazil, Murder